John William Francis Hallam (28 October 1941 – 14 November 2006) was a British character actor, who frequently played hard men or military types.

Early life 
John Hallam was born, the son of a superintendent at London Docklands, in 1941 in Lisburn, County Antrim, after the family were evacuated to Northern Ireland during the Second World War. On returning to England, he boarded at St Albans School, before starting his working life in a London bank. Despite having a talent for mathematics, he said he was sacked for getting the figures right without being able to explain how he did so. As a result, he ended up selling deckchairs on the South Coast, where he eventually found acting work in repertory theatre.

Career

Stage 
After training at RADA (1962–64), Hallam began acting with Laurence Olivier's embryonic National Theatre Company, playing the Stage Door Keeper in Trelawny of the 'Wells' (Old Vic Theatre, 1965). He was seen performing on television for the first time in 1967, in the small role of a watchman when the BBC screened the director Franco Zeffirelli's National Theatre production of Much Ado About Nothing (Old Vic).

Stage roles became infrequent when an unending flow of film and television work followed.

Film 
On the big screen, he worked his way up from bit-parts as an officer in The Charge of the Light Brigade (directed by Tony Richardson, 1968) and a revolting Burpa tribesman in Carry On Up the Khyber (1968) to more substantial roles as Sir Meles of Bohemia in A Walk with Love and Death (the director John Huston's tale of 14th-century romance in France, 1969).

Over the years he appeared in many films including Where's Jack? (1969), The Last Valley, Villain, Nicholas and Alexandra, Murphy's War, Quest for Love (1971), The Offence, Antony and Cleopatra (1972), Hennessy (1975), Trial by Combat (1976), The Four Feathers (1978), Love and Bullets (1979), Flash Gordon (1980), Dragonslayer (1981), Ivanhoe (1982), Santa Claus: The Movie (1985), When the Whales Came (1989), and the 1985 science-fiction cult film Lifeforce, directed by Tobe Hooper. 

He appeared in Agatha Christie’s Miss Marple “4:50 from Paddington” as Cedric Crackenthorple. He also appeared as McTaggart in the director's cut of the 1973 film The Wicker Man. His later film roles included a Baron in Robin Hood: Prince of Thieves (1991) and as Mandara in Kull the Conqueror (1997).

Television 
In 1973 he played the troubled Dr. Peter Conway in the science fiction series Moonbase 3. Later in the decade he appeared as "uncle" Harry Farmer, a former soldier who is invalided out of the army in the BBC Television First World War drama series, Wings (1977-1978).

Another notable television role was as Thomas Mallen in Catherine Cookson’s adaptation drama series The Mallens (1979). 

He also appeared as "Gypsy Joe" in the Minder episode "In", (1982) and in the BBC's television adaptations of two tales from The Chronicles of Narnia: Prince Caspian and The Voyage of the Dawn Treader, from 1988 until 1990, and later starred as Ali Ben Hassad in the 1998 TV movie The Incredible Adventures of Marco Polo. He also appeared in the show Blackadder (1983 Season 1, Episode 6: The Black Seal) as Sir Wilfred Death.

He had a semi-regular role in the BBC soap opera EastEnders, playing prison inmate Barnsey Barnes, a character that appears as the cellmate of regular character Den Watts (Leslie Grantham) while he is serving time at the fictional Dickens Hill prison. Hallam appeared on the show between 1988 and 1989. In 1989 he appeared in the Doctor Who serial "Ghost Light" appearing as the memorable alien "Light".

Personal life 
Hallam married theatrical mask-maker Vicky Brinkworth in 1966, and they had four children together, but divorced in 1992 after twenty-six years of marriage.

Hallam was a cousin of actor Clive Mantle, who is known for playing Mike Barrett in Casualty during the 1990s, and Little John in the 1980s fantasy series Robin of Sherwood.

Hallam’s daughter Nancy is married to former footballer, Ian Wright.

Death 
On 14 November 2006, Hallam died of testicular cancer in Clifton, Oxfordshire, England after a brief spell of ill health.

Filmography

References

External links

John Hallam obituary in The Independent 20 November 2006

1941 births
2006 deaths
British male stage actors
British male film actors
British male television actors
People from Lisburn
Alumni of RADA
Deaths from cancer in England
Deaths from testicular cancer